P87 may refer to:

 Curtiss XP-87 Blackhawk, an American prototype fighter aircraft
 Henschel Projekt P.87, a proposed German bomber aircraft
 , a patrol boat of the Royal Australian Navy
 p87PIKAP, phosphoinositide-3-kinase adapter protein of 87 kDa
 Papyrus 87, a biblical manuscript
 Serenade in D major, P. 87, by Michael Haydn
 WM P87, a sports prototype race car
 P87, state regional road in Latvia